Ana González may refer to:

Ana González (fashion designer) (born 1970), Spanish fashion designer
Ana González (footballer) (born 1995), Spanish footballer
Ana González Olea (1915–2008), Chilean theater, radio, and television actress
Ana Patricia González (born 1987), Mexican beauty queen

See also
Ana María González (disambiguation), several people
Ana Gonçalves (disambiguation)